Saneamento Básico (Portuguese for "basic sanitation") is a 2007 Brazilian comedy film written and directed by Jorge Furtado. It stars Fernanda Torres, Wagner Moura, Camila Pitanga, Bruno Garcia, Lázaro Ramos, Tonico Pereira and Paulo José.

Plot
The people of Linha Cristal, a fictitious village of Italo-Brazilian descendants in Serra Gaúcha, gather to discuss the construction of a septic tank for sewage treatment. They form a commission which is responsible in ordering the budget to the town hall. The secretary of the mayor recognizes the need of the tank, but informs that there is no budget available. There is, however, R$10,000 available for the production of a film. This money was sent by the federal government and will be sent back if not used soon. The people of Linha Cristal have the idea of using the money to make a low-budget documentary about the construction of the tank, but the film has to be fictitious. Then, they decide to make a science fiction B movie which tells the story of a monster who lives in the building site of a tank.

Cast
Fernanda Torres as Marina
Wagner Moura as Joaquim
Camila Pitanga as Silene
Bruno Garcia as Fabrício
Lázaro Ramos as Zico
Janaína Kremer as Marcela
Tonico Pereira as Antônio
Paulo José as Otaviano

Release

Critical reception
According to Ana Paula Sousa, film reviewer of CartaCapital, Saneamento Básico is one of a few really funny films in recent Brazilian cinema. On the other hand, Dayanne Mikevis, reviewer of Folha de S.Paulo, says the film is a "light entertainment" and a "naïve comedy".

Box office
As of August 12, 2007, Saneamento Básico had grossed R$1,066,051 and sold over 120,000 tickets in Brazil.

References

External links
 
 

2007 films
Brazilian comedy films
2000s Portuguese-language films
Films directed by Jorge Furtado
2007 comedy films